Wil Powell (born 26 August 1999) is a professional Australian rules footballer playing for the Gold Coast Suns in the Australian Football League (AFL). He made his debut in round 15 of the 2018 season against the Collingwood Magpies at Carrara Stadium and scored a goal with his first kick.

Powell is from Scarborough, Western Australia and played colts football for the Claremont Tigers in the West Australian Football League (WAFL). He averaged 14 disposals and kicked eight goals from 18 games and was invited to test at the Western Australian State Combine. Powell was selected by the Suns with pick 19 in the 2017 national draft, their first selection. He was described as a "shock pick" and a "bolter"; Claremont had earlier posted a list of possible draftees from the club on Twitter, but Powell was not included.

In May 2018, Powell extended his contract with the Suns to 2021.

His 2022 season ended early with a compound fracture to his ankle.

Statistics
 Statistics are correct to the end of round 3, 2022

|-
|- style="background-color: #EAEAEA"
! scope="row" style="text-align:center" | 2018
|style="text-align:center;"|
| 27 || 7 || 2 || 4 || 37 || 24 || 61 || 18 || 14 || 0.3 || 0.6 || 5.3 || 3.4 || 8.7 || 2.6 || 2.0
|-
! scope="row" style="text-align:center" | 2019
|style="text-align:center;"|
| 27 || 13 || 7 || 5 || 88 || 70 || 158 || 46 || 35 || 0.5 || 0.4 || 6.8 || 5.4 || 12.2 || 3.5 || 2.7
|- style="background-color: #EAEAEA"
! scope="row" style="text-align:center" | 2020
|style="text-align:center;"|
| 27 || 15 || 2 || 0 || 102 || 95 || 197 || 50 || 25 || 0.1 || 0.0 || 6.8 || 6.3 || 13.1 || 3.3 || 1.7
|-
! scope="row" style="text-align:center" | 2021
|style="text-align:center;"|
| 27 || 22 || 1 || 1 || 259 || 132 || 391 || 115 || 54 || 0.0 || 0.0 || 11.8 || 6.0 || 17.8 || 5.2 || 2.5
|- style="background-color: #EAEAEA"
! scope="row" style="text-align:center" | 2022
|style="text-align:center;"|
| 27 || 3 || 0 || 0 || 29 || 14 || 43 || 11 || 5 || 0.0 || 0.0 || 9.7 || 4.7 || 14.3 || 3.7 || 1.7
|-
|- class="sortbottom"
! colspan=3| Career
! 60
! 12
! 10
! 515
! 335
! 850
! 240
! 133
! 0.2
! 0.2
! 8.6
! 5.6
! 14.2
! 4.0
! 2.2
|}

Notes

References

External links 

 
 

Living people
1999 births
Claremont Football Club players
Gold Coast Football Club players
Australian rules footballers from Western Australia